Music From "Mo' Better Blues" is a collaborative album by Branford Marsalis Quartet and Terence Blanchard. It was released in 1990 through Columbia/CBS Records as a soundtrack to Spike Lee's 1990 film Mo' Better Blues. Recording sessions took place at RCA Studios and Sound On Sound in New York. Production was handled by Bill Lee, Delfeayo Marsalis, Raymond Jones and DJ Premier, with Spike Lee serving as executive producer. It features contributions from film stars Cynda Williams, Denzel Washington and Wesley Snipes, and American hip hop duo Gang Starr.

The album peaked at number 63 on the US Billboard 200 albums chart. Music video was released for a single "Jazz Thing". In 1991, the soundtrack received a nomination for a Soul Train Music Award for Best Jazz Album, while the song "Again Never" was nominated for a Grammy Award for Best Jazz Instrumental Performance, Group at the 33rd Annual Grammy Awards.

Accolades

Track listing

Personnel 

 Branford Marsalis – soprano and tenor saxophone, co-producer (track 8)
 Kenny Kirkland – piano
 Robert Hurst – bass
 Jeff "Tain" Watts – drums
 Terence Blanchard – trumpet
 Cynda Williams – backing vocals (track 1), alto vocals (track 9)
 Denzel Washington – vocals (track 6)
 Wesley Snipes – vocals (track 6)
 Keith "GuRu" Elam – rap vocals (track 8)
 B. David Whitworth – backing vocals (track 8)
 Mark Ledford – backing vocals (track 8)
 Tawatha Agee – backing vocals (track 8)
 Brooklyn Crooks – chorus shouts vocals (track 8)
 Clare Fischer – string arrangement and conductor (tracks: 1, 9)
 Peter Hunstein – programming (track 8)
 Raymond Jones – producer (tracks: 1, 9)
 Delfeayo Marsalis – producer (tracks: 2, 3, 6, 7)
 William "Bill" Lee III – producer (tracks: 4, 5)
 Chris "DJ Premier" Martin – producer (track 8)
 Larry DeCarmine – recording (tracks: 1, 9)
 Larry Ferguson – mixing (tracks: 1, 9)
 Patrick Smith – recording and mixing (tracks: 2–7)
 Rob Hunter – recording and mixing (track 8)
 Shelton Jackson "Spike" Lee – executive producer
 Ken Kochman – design

Charts

References

External links 

Jazz soundtracks
1990 soundtrack albums
Branford Marsalis albums
Terence Blanchard albums
Columbia Records soundtracks
Albums produced by DJ Premier